Henri Gamache was the pseudonym of an otherwise unknown author who was active in the United States during the 1940s, and who wrote on the subject of magic. All his books were published in New York City and most of them consist of semi-scholarly popular compilations that draw from (and give credit to) previously-published works on occultism.  His works are noted for their connection to the Afrocentric theories of Marcus Garvey.

Disputed identity

Henri Gamache's  most popular books are The Master Book of Candle-Burning, a classic of practical African American hoodoo folk magic, Terrors of the Evil Eye Exposed, a work dealing with worldwide belief in the evil eye, and Mystery of the Long Lost Eighth, Ninth, and Tenth Books of Moses, which is based upon the Garveyist assertion that Moses, the leader of the Jews, was a Black African.

The identity of Henri Gamache is disputed. Some researchers take at face value the mid-1950s copyright renewal claims of  a book publisher named Joseph W. Kay (a.k.a. Joseph Spitalnick),  in which Kay claimed to be the actual author of all works by both Henri Gamache and a pseudonymous occult author of the 1930s, Lewis de Claremont (also spelled Louis de Clermont). The falsity of Kay's claims with regard to the works of de Claremont is demonstrable, because the de Claremont books were first published by another company and only assigned to Kay upon republication, and this obvious attempt at deception in turn casts doubt upon Kay's claim to the Gamache authorship.

Joe Kay died in 1967, but interviews with younger members of the Kay family have brought out the fact that the elder Kay obtained copyright ownership and publication rights to the previously published writings of a Mr. Young, whose first name is lost, in exchange for a debt owed. Young is mentioned as a writer of occult books within the pages of the ghost-written autobiography of the famous African American stage magician Benjamin Rucker, better known as Black Herman.

Thus it seems that both Henri Gamache and Lewis de Claremont / Louis de Clermont were not pseudonyms for Joe Kay (Joseph Spitalnik), but for Mr. Young, the ghost-writer of the Black Herman autobiography.

In 2013, Catherine Yronwode published an account of an interview with Ed Kay, the son of Joseph Kay, in which Ed Kay stated that he recalled Henri Gamache as the pseudonym of a "young college educated Jewish woman who worked for my father and wrote books for him"

Books by Mr. Young
(ghostwriter) Black Herman [Benjamin Rucker]. Secrets of Magic, Mystery, and Legerdemain. Martin Publishing, 1925. Republished in 1938 by Dorene Publishing.

Books by Henri Gamache
 The Master Book of Candle-Burning". 1942
 The Magic of Herbs". 1945
 Mystery of the Long Lost 8th, 9th, and 10th Books of Moses. 1945 
 Terrors of the Evil Eye Exposed. Raymond Publishing, 1946. Republished as Protection Against Evil. Raymond Publishing, 1969.

References

Gamache, Henri
20th-century American non-fiction writers
Hoodoo (spirituality)